Graneker Rangers FC was a South African football (soccer) club based in Johannesburg.
Rangers FC won the Castle Cup in 1959 and played the final in 1967. Their best season in the National Football League was the inaugural season in 1959, when they finished Runners-up to Durban City. The club merged with Johannesburg Ramblers for the 1963-season.

External links
 expro.co.za

 
Soccer clubs in Johannesburg
Soccer clubs in Gauteng
National Football League (South Africa) clubs
1889 establishments in the South African Republic
Soccer and apartheid